Nikki Lee may refer to:

Nikki S. Lee, Korean photographer and filmmaker
Nikki (singer), Japanese-American musician, named Nikki Lee
Nicole Paparistodemou, Greek-Cypriot singer, whose stage name is Nikki Lee